Egbert Cleave (flourished 1870s) was an American author from Ohio.

Publications
Cleave's biographical cyclopaedia of homoeopathic physicians and surgeons (1873)
City of Cleveland and Cuyahoga County (1875)
Biographical cyclopædia of Ohio: Hamilton County, city of Cincinnati (1877)
A biographical cyclopædia and portrait gallery of distinguished men (1879)

References

19th-century American writers
Year of death missing
Year of birth missing
Writers from Ohio